Nanadegan (also Romanized as Nanādegān and Nanādgan; also known as Naneh Dagūn and Tanādegān) is a village in Varzaq-e Jonubi Rural District, in the Central District of Faridan County, Isfahan Province, Iran. At the 2006 census, its population was 2,085, in 512 families.

References 

Populated places in Faridan County